I19, I 19 or I-19 may refer to:
 Västerbotten Regiment, a Swedish infantry regiment; active from 1816 to 1841
 Norrbotten Regiment, a Swedish infantry regiment; active from 1841 to 1975, and since 2000
 Interstate 19, an Interstate highway in Arizona